Sumay-ye Shomali Rural District is in Sumay-ye Beradust District of Urmia County, West Azerbaijan province, Iran. At the National Census of 2006, its population was 10,613 in 1,845 households. There were 10,018 inhabitants in 2,187 households at the following census of 2011. At the most recent census of 2016, the population of the rural district was 9,570 in 2,217 households. The largest of its 25 villages was Mamakan, with 1,685 people.

References 

Urmia County

Rural Districts of West Azerbaijan Province

Populated places in West Azerbaijan Province

Populated places in Urmia County